Sanlam is a South African financial services group headquartered in Bellville, Western Cape, South Africa. Sanlam is the largest insurance company in Africa. It is listed on the Johannesburg Stock Exchange, the Namibian Stock Exchange and the A2X. Established in 1918 as a life insurance company, Sanlam Group has developed into a diversified financial services business. Its five business clusters comprise Sanlam Personal Finance, Sanlam Emerging Markets, Sanlam Investments, Sanlam Corporate and Santam.

The group's areas of expertise include insurance (life and general), financial planning, retirement annuities, trusts, wills, short-term insurance, asset management, risk management and capital market activities, investment and wealth. The group operates in South Africa, Namibia, Botswana, Swaziland, Zimbabwe, Mauritius, Malawi, Zambia, Tanzania, Rwanda, Uganda, Kenya, Ghana, Nigeria, Mozambique, India, Malaysia and the UK, and has business interests in the US, Australia, Burundi, Lesotho and the Philippines. It has a stake in micro-insurance specialists, UK-based Micro-Ensure Holdings Limited, which has a footprint across Africa and India servicing more than 10 million enrolled clients.

Its 2018 acquisition of SAHAM Finances has made it Africa’s biggest non-banking financial services player and has given it exposure to Morocco, Angola, Algeria, Tunisia, Niger, Mali, Senegal, Guinea, Burkina Faso, Cote D’Ivoire, Togo, Benin, Cameroon, Gabon, Republic of the Congo, Madagascar, Lebanon and Saudi Arabia.

History
The Suid-Afrikaanse Nasionale Trust en Assuransie Maatskappy Beperk (South African National Trust and Assurance Company Limited), Santam, was registered on 28 March 1918. It was then decided to convert the life assurance department into a separate company, and the Suid-Afrikaanse Nasionale Lewens Assuransie Maatskappy Beperk (South African National Life Assurance Company Limited), Sanlam, was registered on 8 June 1918. Sanlam, the subsidiary, later became the spearhead of the operation, while Santam remained focused on short-term insurance.

Sanlam showed a small profit at the end of its first year, declared a bonus, and continued to grow consistently from there.

Santam remained the controlling shareholder until 1954 when Sanlam became an independent mutual life assurance company, as well as the largest single shareholder in Santam.

Over the years, Sanlam's focus gradually shifted from traditional life insurance to providing a broader range of financial products and services. In 1998 Sanlam demutualised, listing on the Johannesburg Stock Exchange (JSE) Ltd and the Namibian Stock Exchange. This changed Sanlam from a mutual entity into a public company with a share capital, namely Sanlam Life Insurance Ltd. At the same time a separate company, Sanlam Ltd, was installed as the parent company of the Sanlam group of businesses. The group was also restructured into several independent businesses within a federal business structure.

Today, Sanlam is a diversified financial services provider with an extensive product offering catering for all market segments. The group has consistently grown its local as well as an international footprint – it now has a presence in 33 African countries also India, Malaysia, the UK and Ireland, the USA, Australia and the Philippines.

In 2018, Sanlam concluded its $1.1 billion acquisition of SAHAM Finances. Additionally, the group announced details of its R11 billion BEE deal, which will see it increasing its direct black shareholding to 18% and black economic ownership to 35%.

In December 2021, The Sanlam Group entered into discussions with Allianz for the acquisition of the entire group in Africa except South Africa. Discussions are conducted between the group's headquarters in Bellville and Munich.

In February 2023, South African wills and estates administrator Capital Legacy and Sanlam announced that they would joining forces by creating a wills, estates and trusts business together. The transaction, which is subject to regulatory approval, will see Sanlam Life Insurance Limited (Sanlam Life) sell its trust business, Sanlam Trust, to Capital Legacy and Sanlam Life acquiring a 26% interest in the enlarged Capital Legacy Group that includes the Sanlam Trust business following completion of the transaction. The merged entity will be managed by Capital Legacy.

Economic empowerment 
Sanlam has since 1993 contributed to broad-based black economic empowerment (B-BBEE) through the group’s partnership with Ubuntu-Botho Investments.

The Ubuntu-Botho B-BBEE partnership resulted in a broad-based black empowerment consortium buying a 10% shareholding in Sanlam in what was to become one of the most far-reaching black empowerment transactions in South Africa to date.

In December 2013, the initial 10-year contractual period of the transaction with Ubuntu-Botho ended, with a final total of 66.5 million deferred shares qualifying for conversion to ordinary shares. The deal created value of about R15 billion, making it arguably one of the most successful transactions of its kind in South African history. In 2014, an agreement was reached to extend the partnership with Ubuntu-Botho into the future.

In 2018, Sanlam announced details of BEE transactions, which will increase its direct black shareholding to 18% and black economic ownership to 35%. The Group will sell 5% of its issued shares to new and existing B-BBEE shareholders, creating a master trust that caters to 80% of the intended beneficiaries, with Ubuntu-Botho benefitting from the other 20%.

Operations
The corporate office of the Sanlam Group is responsible for centralised functions that include strategic direction, group financial and risk management, group marketing and communications, group human resources and information technology, group sustainability management, corporate social investment and general group services.

In addition, the Sanlam group operations are managed through five operating clusters:
 Sanlam Personal Finance
 Sanlam Emerging Markets
 Sanlam Investments 
 Sanlam Corporate 
 Santam

The core businesses within each cluster are as follows (wholly owned unless otherwise indicated):

Sanlam Personal Finance

The largest business in the Sanlam Group of companies, with 11,406 employees and assets worth R 472,328 million under management.

 Sanlam Sky Solutions: Financial services for individuals and groups in the entry-level market
 Sanlam Individual Life: Financial services to the middle-income, professional and business-owner markets
 Glacier: Financial services for the affluent market
Strategic business development consists of the following diversified financial services: Sanlam Trust (estate and trust services), Multi-Data (electronic money-transfer activities), Sanlam Healthcare Management (medical scheme administration services), Sanlam Personal Loans (70%) (personal loans joint venture), Reality (loyalty programme) and Anglo African Finance (55%) (trade and bridging finance).

Sanlam Emerging Markets 
The Sanlam Emerging Markets cluster is responsible for Sanlam’s financial business services (life insurance, general insurance, banking, retail credit, health, bancassurance, asset management and specialist general insurance products) in emerging markets outside South Africa:

 Botswana Life, Botswana – 60% via Botswana Insurance Holdings Limited (BIHL)
 Sanlam Life, Namibia – 100%
 Sanlam Namibia Holdings, Namibia – 59%
 NICO Life, Malawi – 62%
 Sanlam Life Insurance, Kenya – 57% via Sanlam Kenya Group 
 Sanlam Life Insurance, Tanzania – 64%
 Sanlam Life Insurance, Zambia – 70%
Sanlam Life Insurance, Uganda – 100%
 Sanlam Life Insurance, Nigeria – 100%
 Sanlam General Insurance, Nigeria – 100%
 Shriram Life Insurance, India – 42% via Shriram Capital
 Soras Vie, Rwanda – 100% 
 MCIS Insurance, Malaysia – 51%
 Sanlam Life Insurance, Mozambique – 51%
Zimnat Life Assurance, Zimbabwe – 40%

Credit and banking:
 Letshego, operating in a number of African countries – 14% via BIHL
 NBS Bank, Malawi – 13% via NICO Holdings
 Shriram Transport Finance Company, India 10% (3% direct and 7% via Shriram Capital)
 Shriram City Union Finance – 9% via Shriram Capital

Investment management: 
 Sanlam Investments, East Africa, Kenya & Uganda – 56%
Sanlam Investments, Namibia – 86%
Botswana Insurance Fund Management – 60% via BIHL

General insurance: Jointly responsible in partnership with Santam for managing general insurance business through:
 NICO Malawi – 62% (direct 49% and 13% indirect via NICO Holdings)
 Sanlam General Insurance Tanzania – 52% (direct 47% and 5% indirect via NICO Holdings)
 Sanlam General Insurance Uganda – 84%(direct 79%and 5% indirect via NICO Holdings)
 NICO Zambia – 62% (direct 49% and 13% indirect via NICO Holdings)
 Shriram General Insurance, India – 43% via Shriram Capital
 Pacific & Orient, Malaysia – 49%
 Legal Guard, Botswana – 60% via BIHL
 Soras AG, Rwanda – 100%
 Santam Namibia – 37%
 Sanlam General Insurance, Kenya – 39%
FBN Insurance, Nigeria – 35%
Zimnat Lion Insurance, Zimbabwe – 40%

Sanlam Investments

Asset management 
 Sanlam Investment Management (SIM) – manages institutional portfolios and retail collective investment (unit trust) funds
 Sanlam Structured Solutions – structured products

Multi-management 
 Sanlam Multi Manager International (SMMI) – investment management advisory business

Alternative investments 
 Blue Ink – hedge fund manager focusing on both the local and global investment markets
 Sanlam Alternative Investments – focuses on the compounding of positive investment returns coupled with downside protection strategies to generate wealth for retail and institutional clients 
 Sanlam Africa Investments – with a presence in 13 African countries, Sanlam Africa Investments enables investors to capitalise on African growth opportunities by successfully sourcing and managing investments across a range of asset classes

Passive investments 
 Satrix – offers investors easy, cost effective access to the markets through a wide range of passively managed investment products

Capital management: 
 Capital management – manages portions of Sanlam's third-party and policyholders' funds
 Sanlam Capital Markets (SCM)
 Sanlam Private Equity (SPE)

Employee benefits 
 Sanlam Employee Benefits – Provides risk and investment administration services to institutions and retirement funds
 Sanlam Group Risk (SGR)
 Sanlam Employee Benefits Investments (SEB Investments)
 Sanlam Umbrella Solutions (SUS)
 Sanlam Retirement Fund Administration (RFA)
 Simeka Consultants and Actuaries

Wealth management 
 Sanlam Private Wealth (SPW) – Private client wealth management and stockbroking 
 Calibre Investments – 50.1% – Australian investment management 
 Sanlam Private Investments UK – 97% – UK private wealth management and stockbroking 
 Summit Trust – 65% – International independent trust services group in Switzerland
 Investment Advisory Services and Fiduciary and Tax services

International investments 
 Sanlam International Investment Partners – manages established partnerships with specialist investment management firms abroad
 SIM Global – manages long-only specialist international equity funds
 Sanlam Asset Management Ireland (SAMI) – Sanlam's international investment management platform in Dublin managing funds domiciled in Ireland
 Sanlam UK – wealth management player in retail financial services in the United Kingdom, comprising Sanlam Investments and Pensions, Sanlam Distribution, Sanlam Private Wealth and Investment Management
 P2 International – International Mutual Fund Administration Investment services
 Sanlam Collective Investments – retail, multi-managed, institutional and third-party collective investment (unit trust) funds

Santam 
Sanlam has an effective 60% interest in Santam, which in turn operates through the following businesses:
 Santam Insurance – traditional and specialist lines intermediated business
 MiWay and Centriq– short-term insurance to clients through a direct distribution channel
 Santam Re – reinsurance in emerging markets

Sanlam Group Executive 

Paul Hanratty, Group Chief Executive Officer
 Anton Gildenhuys, Chief Executive Officer: SA Retail Affluent
 Tavaziva Madzinga, Chief Executive Officer: Santam Limited
 Bongani Madikiza, Chief Executive Officer: SA Retail Mass
 Sydney Mbhele, Group Executive: Sanlam Brand
 Jeanett Modise, Chief Executive: Human Resources
 Kanyisa Mkhize, Chief Executive Officer: Sanlam Corporate
 Wikus Olivier, Group Executive: Strategy
 Robert Roux, Chief Executive Officer: Sanlam Investment Group
 Karl Socikwa, Group Executive: Market Development
 Jurie Strydom, Chief Executive Officer: Life and Savings
 Heinie Werth, Chief Executive Officer: Sanlam Emerging Markets. Executive Director
 Mlondolozi Mahlangeni, Chief Risk Officer. Chief Actuary
 Abigail Mukhuba, Financial Director

Recent news 
For the six months to June 2015, Sanlam reported an increase in new business volumes of 22% to R100 billion compared to the same period in 2014. The net result from financial services increased by 5% on the first half of 2014; up 11% excluding certain one-off items. The annualised Return on Group Equity Value (RoGEV) per share of 13% exceeded the target of 12.1%. RoGEV is the group's primary performance target for measuring shareholder value creation.

Ian Kirk was appointed as Group Chief Executive and Executive Director of Sanlam Limited and Sanlam Life Insurance Limited from 1 July 2015. This follows the retirement of former Group Chief Executive Dr Johan van Zyl from this position, as well as from the boards of Sanlam Limited and Sanlam Life Insurance Ltd.

In November 2015 Sanlam announced that the group had agreed to buy a 30 percent stake in Morocco-based Saham Finances, which operates in 26 countries predominantly across Africa with a presence in the Middle East. The US$375 million deal will significantly expand the group's African footprint.

Former CEO, Dr Johan van Zyl, joined the Sanlam Limited and Sanlam Life Insurance Limited Boards as a non-executive director and representative of Ubuntu-Botho Investment Holdings, Sanlam's black economic empowerment partner as of 18 January 2016.

A new business cluster known as Sanlam Corporate was created early in 2016. The unit will be headed by the former CEO of Munich Re sub-Saharan Africa, Junior John Ngulube and will offer corporate clients life insurance, general insurance, investments, health insurance, retirement, financial planning and advice.

In February 2023 Capital Legacy and Sanlam announced that they would be joining forces by creating an even more compelling wills, estates and trusts business together.

See also

 Economy of South Africa

References

Publicly traded companies
Insurance companies
Insurance companies of South Africa
Companies based in Cape Town
Economy of the Western Cape
Financial services companies established in 1918
Companies listed on the Johannesburg Stock Exchange
Financial services companies of South Africa
1918 establishments in South Africa
Companies listed on the Namibian Stock Exchange